Veronica Grymonprez (born 17 January 1944) is a Belgian gymnast. She competed at the 1960 Summer Olympics and the 1964 Summer Olympics.

References

1944 births
Living people
Belgian female artistic gymnasts
Olympic gymnasts of Belgium
Gymnasts at the 1960 Summer Olympics
Gymnasts at the 1964 Summer Olympics
Gymnasts from Berlin